The Embassy of the Kingdom of Saudi Arabia in Tehran was the diplomatic mission of Saudi Arabia in Iran until January 2016 when direct bilateral diplomatic relations between the two governments were severed following the mob attack and sacking of the embassy in January 2016.

History
Prior to January 2016, the mission was headed by Hasan Ibrahm Hamad Al-Zoyed, ambassador of the Kingdom of Saudi Arabia in Tehran.

After the execution of Nimr al-Nimr, a prominent Shiite cleric, in January 2016 by the Saudi government, an angry Iranian mob attacked the Embassy in Tehran. 

The embassy was set on fire by an Iranian mob with a Molotov cocktail. The embassy was empty during the protests. 

Iranian police responded to the riot and arrested 40 people during the incident. The day after, protests were held again by hundreds of Iranians in Tehran, and President Rouhani called the damage on embassy "by no means justifiable". The Iranian Foreign Ministry has appealed for the public to calm and to respect diplomatic premises. The Saudi Arabia government severed the bilateral relationship between the two governments following the incident.

See also

 Iran–Saudi Arabia relations
 Ambassadors of Saudi Arabia to Iran
 Diplomatic missions of Saudi Arabia

References

Iran
Saudi Arabia
Iran–Saudi Arabia relations